Morcillo is a surname. Notable people with the surname include:

Ángel Moreno Morcillo (born 1997), Spanish footballer
Diego Morcillo Rubio de Auñón (1642–1730), Spanish bishop
Jon Morcillo (born 1998), Spanish footballer
Jorge Morcillo (born 1986), Spanish footballer
Sebastián Fox Morcillo (1526?-1559?), Spanish scholar and philosopher